Fudbalski klub Hercegovac Bileća is a football club from the town of Bileća, in the south of Republika Srpska of Bosnia and Herzegovina.

History
It was established in 1935. They played in the 2004–05 First League of the Republika Srpska season, which was on the highest level they have ever played.

Club seasons
Sources:

References

Football clubs in Bosnia and Herzegovina
Football clubs in Republika Srpska
Association football clubs established in 1935
Sport in the Federation of Bosnia and Herzegovina